Stanley Brian Reynolds (16 January 1926 – 14 April 2018) was an English jazz trumpeter.

Life and work
Reynolds began his musical career when he toured with the Tommy Sampson Orchestra at age 14. In 1948, he played with Ted Heath and His Music, and from the 1950s, he also worked with Vic Lewis, Dave Shepherd, Kenny Baker, Johnny Keating, Louie Bellson and Buddy Rich. As a session musician, he was involved as a soloist on the Beatles' White Album with a trumpet solo in "Martha My Dear". In 1975, under his own name the, he created his own big band album, The Greatest Swing Band in the World...is British (PYE). In the 1980s, he worked with Barbara Thompson and Chris Smith. In the field of jazz he was involved in 84 recording sessions between 1948 and 1989. He died on 14 April 2018 at age 92.

External links

References

1926 births
2018 deaths
English jazz trumpeters
Male trumpeters
People from Lincoln, England
British male jazz musicians